'''Romer Leslie "Les" Brownlee(born in 1939)  served as the Under Secretary of the Army from  November 2001 to December 2004 and as Acting United States Secretary of the Army from 17 November 2004 until his resignation effective 19 November 2004, staying at the Undersecretary's office.  Bill Gertz wrote that Donald Rumsfeld did not wish to name a non-CEO to the job of secretary.

Military service
Brownlee is a retired Army colonel. He was commissioned in 1962 as a lieutenant in the infantry through the Army Reserve Officers' Training Corps program at the University of Wyoming. He is a distinguished honor graduate of the U.S. Army Ranger Course, an honor graduate of both the Infantry Officer Advanced Course and the Command and General Staff College, and a graduate of the Army's airborne course as well as the Army War College. Brownlee served two tours in Vietnam. During the last two and a half years of a four and a half year tour in the Pentagon, before retiring in 1984, he was Military Executive to Under Secretary of the Army James Ambrose.

His military decorations include the Silver Star with oak leaf cluster, the Bronze Star with two oak leaf clusters, and the Purple Heart. He holds a master's degree in business administration from the University of Alabama.

Career
Brownlee became the 27th Under Secretary of the Army on 14 November 2001, following his nomination by President George W. Bush and confirmation by the United States Senate. From 10 May 2003 until 19 November 2004, he served as the Acting Secretary of the Army. As Under Secretary, Brownlee assisted the secretary in fulfilling statutory responsibilities for recruiting, organizing, supplying, equipping, training and mobilizing the United States Army and managing its $98.5 billion annual budget and more than 1.3 million active duty, Army National Guard, Army Reserve and civilian personnel.

Brownlee served on the Republican staff of the Senate Armed Services Committee beginning in January 1987, under both Senator Strom Thurmond and Senator John Warner. In March 1996, Brownlee was designated staff director of the Senate Committee on Armed Services by then chairman, Sen. Thurmond. In January 1999, he was designated staff director for then chairman, Sen. Warner, serving until November 2001 when he was confirmed as the Under Secretary of the Army.

From 1987 to 1996, he was a professional staff member responsible for Army and Marine Corps programs, special operations forces and drug interdiction policy and support. In addition, as deputy staff director, he was deeply involved in policies and programs relating to ballistic missile defense, strategic deterrence and naval strategy, shipbuilding and weapons programs.

Family
His son, John L. Brownlee is a former U.S. Attorney, and an unsuccessful candidate for the Republican nomination for Virginia Attorney General in 2009.

References

External links
Public domain biography provided by the United States Department of Defense

1939 births
Living people
United States Army colonels
United States Secretaries of the Army
United States Army personnel of the Vietnam War
United States Army Command and General Staff College alumni
Recipients of the Silver Star
George W. Bush administration personnel
Texas Republicans
United States Under Secretaries of the Army